Cecilia Alacán Garcia (born 22 November 1966) is a Cuban former judoka, who won three gold medals at the Pan American Judo Championships and two medals at the Pan American Games.

Career
Alacán won a bronze medal at the 1983 Pan American Games in the U52 event. In 1984, she won the U52 event at the Pan American Judo Championships in Mexico City. She won the U56 event in 1986 and 1988, in Puerto Rico and Buenos Aires. Alacán also won a gold medal at the 1987 Pan American Games. She came joint fifth in the U56 event at the 1987 World Judo Championships.

References

1966 births
Living people
Cuban female judoka
Pan American Games medalists in judo
Pan American Games gold medalists for Cuba
Pan American Games bronze medalists for Cuba
Judoka at the 1983 Pan American Games
Judoka at the 1987 Pan American Games
Medalists at the 1987 Pan American Games
20th-century Cuban women
20th-century Cuban people
21st-century Cuban women